"Haute" is a song by American rapper Tyga. It was released on June 5, 2019 as the seventh single from his seventh album Legendary for streaming and digital download by Last Kings Music and Empire Distribution. The song was produced by Dr. Luke and includes two guest verses from reggaeton singer J Balvin and longtime collaborator Chris Brown. The music video was also released on June 5, 2019.

Charts

References

2019 singles
2019 songs
Tyga songs
J Balvin songs
Chris Brown songs
Songs written by Chris Brown
Songs written by Tyga
Songs written by J Balvin
Songs written by Dr. Luke
Song recordings produced by Dr. Luke
Empire Distribution singles